James Wilson  was an 18th-century songwriter from Hexham, Northumberland.

Early life 
James Wilson was a schoolteacher by trade.

After spending some time teaching in Hexham, he suffered financial embarrassment and had to move away.

He chose Morpeth, where he met a fellow schoolteacher, who was also a poet and songwriter, Wallis Ogle, who managed to find him a post at Causey Park Bridge School (spelt "Cawsey" in John Bell's Rhymes of Northern Bards), where shortly after he died.

He was a poet and songwriter and had 4 songs published in Bell's Rhymes of Northern Bards in 1812.

While living in Morpeth he collected together some of his works into a volume and they were published in a chapbook printed by T Angus, Newcastle in 1778.

Works 
These include:
 The Banks of the Tyne
 A Few Lines on Laying the Foundation Stone of Hexham Bridge
 Ode - "Addressed to Sir Walter Blackett, Bart." - was "wrote" by the author on the very day the building of Hexham Bridge was undertaken
 A Song by Mr James Wilson of Cawsey Park on Mr Coughan and family, leaving Hebron Hill

See also 
 Geordie dialect words
 Rhymes of Northern Bards

References

External links
Rhymes of Northern Bards

English male poets
English songwriters
People from Hexham
18th-century deaths
18th-century births
Geordie songwriters